Jay-R C. Reyes (born July 16, 1984) is a Filipino former professional basketball player who last played for the Phoenix Super LPG Fuel Masters of the Philippine Basketball Association.

Professional career
Reyes was the youngest player in the 2006–07 PBA season at only 22 years of age. He played 35 games and he averaged 12.51 points per game, 1.57 blocks per game and 8.89 rebounds per game. He was one of the rookies who led the PBA in the top ten in the rebound category.

On January 20, Rain or Shine Elasto Painters, Meralco Bolts and Air21 Express were involved in a tree way trade. Rain or Shine was able to get Ronjay Buenafe, Ronnie Matias, the 2011 and 2013 1st round picks from Air21 and Beau Belga from Meralco. Meralco will now have Solomon Mercado and Paolo Bugia from Rain or Shine and Erick Rodriguez of Air21. Air21 will now have Jay-R Reyes from Rain or Shine, Reed Juntilla from Meralco and the 2011 and 2013 second round pics from Meralco.

After playing one conference with the Air21 Express, Jay-R Reyes has been traded for Alaska Aces' top scorer Joe Devance. It was reported that Joe Devance wanted out of Alaska, hoping to get better compensation somewhere else. The Alaska manager already offer JDV a 350,000 php a month.

He was traded to Meralco Bolts for Gabby Espinas and also allows the Aces to swap first round draft picks in the 2012 PBA draft .

After Meralco's elimination in the Governor's Cup Semifinals series against San Mig Coffee Mixers, he was traded to Barangay Ginebra San Miguel for Kerby Raymundo .

He was traded to San Miguel Beermen in a three team trade involving Barangay Ginebra San Miguel and Barako Bull Energy who Barangay Ginebra send big man Jay-R Reyes to the Barako Bull Energy in exchange for big man Dorian Peña and Barako's 2015 2nd round pick and then Jay-R Reyes traded by the Barako Bull Energy in exchange for Justin Chua and SMB's 2017 1st round pick, Later on August 31, 2015.

On October 17, 2017, Reyes, along with Rashawn McCarthy, Ronald Tubid, and a 2019 first round pick, to the Kia Picanto for the first overall pick of the 2017 PBA draft. The pick was used by San Miguel to draft Christian Standhardinger.

On February 6, 2020, he signed with the Phoenix Super LPG Fuel Masters.

On May 15, 2021, Reyes retired from professional basketball.

PBA career statistics

Season-by-season averages

|-
| align="left" | 
| align="left" | Welcoat
| 35 || 34.5 || .405 || .000 || .576 || 8.9 || 1.1 || .5 || 1.6 || 12.5
|-
| align="left" | 
| align="left" | Welcoat
| 31 || 30.1 || .430 || .182 || .695 || 6.5 || 1.6 || .4 || 1.0 || 12.4
|-
| align="left" | 
| align="left" | Rain or Shine
| 44 || 29.2 || .450 || .406 || .598 || 8.0 || 1.0 || .5 || .7 || 12.2
|-
| align="left" | 
| align="left" | Rain or Shine
| 50 || 25.4 || .359 || .218 || .522 || 6.8 || .9 || .4 || .5 || 7.7
|-
| align="left" | 
| align="left" | Rain or Shine
| 42 || 22.6 || .411 || .265 || .555 || 6.2 || .9 || .5 || .8 || 7.4
|-
| align="left" | 
| align="left" | Rain or Shine / Air21 / Alaska
| 40 || 19.5 || .404 || .000 || .548 || 6.1 || .6 || .3 || .5 || 5.6
|-
| align="left" | 
| align="left" | Alaska / Meralco
| 46 || 17.4 || .486 || .167 || .509 || 5.3 || .4 || .2 || .3 || 4.4
|-
| align="left" | 
| align="left" | Barangay Ginebra
| 38 || 14.9 || .453 || .333 || .463 || 5.4 || .7 || .5 || .2 || 4.0
|-
| align="left" | 
| align="left" | Barangay Ginebra / San Miguel
| 29 || 8.4 || .429 || .000 || .579 || 2.5 || .1 || .1 || .3 || 2.0
|-
| align="left" | 
| align="left" | San Miguel
| 39 || 7.5 || .397 || .385 || .533 || 2.0 || .2 || .1 || .2 || 2.1
|-
| align="left" | 
| align="left" | San Miguel
| 21 || 6.7 || .391 || .316 || .563 || 2.1 || .1 || .1 || .2 || 2.4
|-
| align="left" | 
| align="left" | Kia / Columbian
| 15 || 21.2 || .413 || .269 || .680 || 4.9 || .7 || .5 || .7 || 6.7
|-
| align="left" | 
| align="left" | Columbian
| 21 || 13.0 || .354 || .295 || .333 || 3.0 || .9 || .4 || .3 || 3.6
|-
| align="left" | 
| align="left" | Phoenix
| 8 || 9.1 || .333 || .364 || .000 || 1.3 || .6 || .5 || .3 || 1.5
|-class=sortbottom
| align="center" colspan=2 | Career
| 459 || 19.9 || .415 || .279 || .569 || 5.4 || .7 || .4 || .6 || 6.6

References

External links
Player Profile
PBA-Online! Profile
Ginebra to acquire Dorian Pena, JR Reyes to SMB, Justin Chua to Barako in three-team trade

1985 births
Living people
Alaska Aces (PBA) players
Barako Bull Energy players
Barangay Ginebra San Miguel players
Basketball players from Albay
Centers (basketball)
Colegio de San Juan de Letran alumni
Filipino men's basketball players
Meralco Bolts players
Philippine Basketball Association All-Stars
Phoenix Super LPG Fuel Masters players
Power forwards (basketball)
Rain or Shine Elasto Painters players
San Miguel Beermen players
Terrafirma Dyip players
UP Fighting Maroons basketball players